Campo de Ourique is a freguesia (civil parish) and district of Lisbon, the capital of Portugal. Located in the historic center of Lisbon, Campo de Ourique is east of Alcântara, north of Estrela, west of Santo António, and south of Campolide. The population in 2011 was 22,120.

History
This new parish was created with the 2012 Administrative Reform of Lisbon, merging the former parishes of Santo Condestável and Santa Isabel. Currently the priest responsible for the parish is Father José Manuel Pereira de Almeida.

Notable people
Portuguese writer Fernando Pessoa lived in Campo de Ourique and his apartment is now a museum. He is probably the most famous person, that lived in Campo de Ourique. 
Several personalities lived in Campo de Ourique: Fernando Pessoa, Luís de Sttau Monteiro, Jorge Costa Pinto, Jorge Borges de Macedo, Rão Kyao, João Afonso, Manuel João Vieira, João D'Ávila, Fernanda Lapa, Fernanda Borsatti, Miguel Simões, João Peste, São José Lapa, Jorge Silva Melo, José Nascimento, Jorge Martins, Artur Varatojo, Manuel Costa Cabral, Luís Varatojo, Guida Maria, Judith Teixeira.

References

Parishes of Lisbon